The 1996–97 Edmonton Oilers season was the Oilers' 18th season in the NHL. They were coming off a 30–44–8 record, earning 68 points in the 1995–96 season, which led them to failing to qualify for the post-season for the 4th time in a row.

The Oilers had their best season since 1991–92 as they won 36 games and earn 81 points, finishing third place in the Pacific Division and seventh in the Western Conference, earning their first playoff berth in five years. The main reason for the Oilers' turn-around was their solid goaltending and defensive hockey, only allowing 247 goals, 57 fewer than the previous season.

Regular season

On November 26, 1996, the Oilers defeated their provincial rival Calgary Flames on the road by a score of 10-1. Ten different Oilers scored in the game. It was the first time that the Oilers had scored 10 goals in a regular-season game since December 4, 1988, when they defeated the New York Rangers at home by a score of 10-6.

Offensively, Doug Weight led the club once again this season in points, earning 82, and achieved a club high 61 assists. Ryan Smyth had a breakout season, scoring a team high 39 goals and led the team in power play goals with 20.  Andrei Kovalenko, acquired in the off-season, scored 32 goals and 59 points, while Jason Arnott earned 57 points in 67 games. Rookie Mike Grier had 32 points in 79 games, and Mariusz Czerkawski finished third on the team in goals with 26. Boris Mironov anchored the defense, earning 32 points in only 55 games. Todd Marchant led the team in short-handed goals with 4. Team captain Kelly Buchberger provided the team toughness, earning a club high 159 penalty minutes.

In goal, Curtis Joseph got the majority of playing time, winning 32 games while posting a 2.93 GAA and a .907 save percentage. He set a team record with 6 shutouts. Bob Essensa, despite a strong GAA of 2.83, won only 4 games.

The Oilers had the most power-play opportunities during the regular season, with 406 opportunities in total.

Season standings

Schedule and results

Playoffs
The Oilers faced the Central Division winning Dallas Stars in the opening round of the playoffs. After splitting the first 2 games in Dallas, the Oilers returned home for game 3 for their first home playoff game since 1992 and found themselves losing 3–0 with about 4 minutes left in the 3rd period.  Edmonton then struck for 3 goals to tie the game, and Kelly Buchberger provided the overtime heroics, as the Oilers won the game 4–3 and take a 2–1 series lead. Dallas tied the series up again in game 4, however, the Oilers shocked the Stars, winning 1–0 in double overtime in the 5th game in Dallas, and returning to Edmonton in a position to clinch the series. The Stars spoiled the Oilers' party, winning the 6th game 3–2, setting up a game 7 at Reunion Arena in Dallas. The game was a memorable one, as the score was tied up at 3 as the teams headed into overtime. Todd Marchant turned out to be the hero, scoring for the Oilers in the 1st overtime, as Edmonton completed the upset, defeating the Stars in 7 games.

In the 2nd round, Edmonton faced the defending Stanley Cup champions, the Colorado Avalanche, who won the Pacific Division and had 26 more points than the Oilers during the season. The Avalanche won the opening 2 games easily in Denver, and while the Oilers rebounded to win the 3rd game, the Avs proved to be too much for Edmonton to handle, as they won the series in 5 games, ending the Oilers' season.

Season stats

Scoring leaders

Goaltending

Playoff stats

Scoring leaders

Goaltending

Awards and records

Awards

Records
 3: Tied NHL record for most short-handed goals in a playoffs by Todd Marchant on May 11, 1997.

Milestones

Transactions

Trades

Free agents

Draft picks
Edmonton's draft picks at the 1996 NHL Entry Draft

References
 National Hockey League Guide & Record Book 2007

Edmonton Oilers season, 1996-97
Edmon
Edmonton Oilers seasons